Lorenzo Ramaciotti (born 1948) is an Italian car designer.  Ramaciotti started his career with Pininfarina in 1972 and retired in 2005. In 2007 he became Group Chief of Design at Fiat Group Automobiles, responsible for all the Fiat Group brands, including Alfa Romeo, Lancia and Maserati. In 2015 he was replaced by Ralph Gilles.

Career 
Ramaciotti was born in Modena.

He graduated from Polytechnic University of Turin with a degree in mechanical engineering in 1972, and joined Pininfarina after graduating. He was appointed General Manager of Pininfarina Studi e Ricerche in early 1988 and in 2002 became Managing Director and CEO of Pininfarina Ricerca and Sviluppo and retired in 2005.

In 2007 he joined Fiat Group as Group Chief of Design after being head-hunted by Fiat's CEO Sergio Marchionne, overseeing design of all the Group marques. In 2011 he was appointed member of the Group Executive Council.

Designs 

Cars design overseen by Ramaciotti at Pininfarina:
Ferrari 456 GT
Ferrari 550 Maranello
Ferrari 360 Modena
Ferrari F430
Ferrari 612 Scaglietti
Peugeot 406 Coupe
Cars designed by Ramaciotti at Centro Stile FCA
Alfa Romeo Giulietta (2010)
Maserati Quattroporte VI (2012)
Alfa Romeo 4C (2013)

References

External links 

1948 births
Living people
Engineers from Modena
Italian automobile designers
Pininfarina people
Fiat people